RDJ is commonly referred to the American actor Robert Downey Jr.

RDJ may refer to:

 Richard D. James, an Irish-born British musician
 Richard D. James Album, his fourth studio album as Aphex Twin
 Former REDjet airline, ICAO code